Rio Grande Pyramid, elevation 13,827 feet, is a summit in the San Juan Mountains of southwest Colorado. The peak is in the Weminuche Wilderness of the San Juan National Forest northeast of Durango.

See also

List of mountain peaks of North America
List of mountain peaks of the United States
List of mountain peaks of Colorado

References

External links

San Juan Mountains (Colorado)
Mountains of Hinsdale County, Colorado
Mountains of Colorado
North American 4000 m summits